Ricus Nel is an Afrikaans musician, singer and songwriter. His debut album, Sak en Pak was released on 15 August 2011 by Select-musiek. He is famous for the ability to have mastered 13 instruments. His second album "Sout van die Aarde" was released on 28 June 2013 at inniBOS. Nel is married to Afrikaans singer Liza Brönner. The couple married on 26 January 2013.

Discography

Albums
 Sak en Pak (2011)
 Sout van die Aarde (2013)
 Sing Don Williams en ander Country legenes (2014)
 Ouskool boerseun (2016)
 Sinkplaat Sessies (Lewendige Opname) (2017)
 Bring Hulde aan Worsie Visser (2017)
 Pure Plaas (2019)
 Ploeg Jy? (2021)

Music video list
 Spyt kom te laat
 Nogsteeds lief vir haar
 Some broken hearts never mend
 Sak en pak
 Ek wonder
 Amanda

Media
 Kyknet: Kwêla Ricus Nel and Liza Brönner
 Huisgenoot: Tempo Winter 2012 Frontpage: Riana Nel, Armand Hofmeyr en Ricus Nel
 MD Greyling Interview with Ricus Nel - Foot In The Door
 Ricus Nel cd launch at inniBOS
 Album: Sout van die Aarde deur Ricus Nel(Deur Huisgenoot Digitaal op August 16, 2013 )
 Ricus Nel, Vetseun Website

See also
 List of Afrikaans singers

References

External links
 
 Official website

Living people
Afrikaans-language singers
South African record producers
South African songwriters
1979 births